"Last Kiss" is a 1961 romantic love song by Wayne Cochran, covered by J. Frank Wilson and the Cavaliers, Canada's Wednesday, Pearl Jam, and others.

Last Kiss or The Last Kiss may also refer to:

Film
 The Last Kiss (1931 film), a British Indian silent film
 The Last Kiss (2001 film) or L'ultimo bacio, an Italian romantic comedy-drama
 The Last Kiss (2006 film), an American remake by Tony Goldwyn

Music
 The Last Kiss (album), a 2009 album by Jadakiss
 "Last Kiss" (Bonnie Pink song), 2004
 "Last Kiss" (Tanpopo song), 1998
 "Last Kiss", a 2009 song by Joe Bonamassa from The Ballad of John Henry
 "Last Kiss", a 2010 song by Taylor Swift from Speak Now
 "The Last Kiss", a 1999 song by AFI from Black Sails in the Sunset
 "The Last Kiss", a 1985 song by David Cassidy from Romance

Other uses
 "Last Kiss", a comic strip by John Lustig

See also 
 The Kaiser's Last Kiss, a 2003 novel by Alan Judd
 One Last Kiss (disambiguation)